
This article lists persons and politicians who have been appointed as the Minister of Social Affairs in Indonesia.

Notes

References

See also 
 Cabinet of Indonesia

Government ministers of Indonesia